Carol Nguyen is a Vietnamese Canadian filmmaker. She is most noted for her films No Crying at the Dinner Table, which was a Canadian Screen Award nominee for Best Short Documentary at the 8th Canadian Screen Awards in 2020, and Nanitic, which won the Share Her Journey award at the 2022 Toronto International Film Festival.

She was named the winner of the $10,000 Toronto Film Critics Association's Jay Scott Prize for emerging filmmakers at the Toronto Film Critics Association Awards 2022.

She is a graduate of Concordia University's Mel Hoppenheim School of Cinema.

Filmography
Uprooted – 2013
The Cookie Thief – 2013
Rhianna's Modern – 2014
Maybe You Are – 2014
How Do You Pronounce Pho? – 2014
This Home Is Not Empty – 2015
Silent Mourners – 2015
Evergreen – 2016
Façade – 2016
Every Grain of Rice – 2017
No Crying at the Dinner Table – 2019
Nanitic – 2022

References

External links

21st-century Canadian screenwriters
21st-century Canadian women writers
Canadian documentary film directors
Canadian women film directors
Canadian people of Vietnamese descent
Concordia University alumni
Living people
Asian-Canadian filmmakers
Canadian writers of Asian descent
Canadian women documentary filmmakers
Year of birth missing (living people)